Novomykolaivka is an urban-type settlement in Kamianske Raion of Dnipropetrovsk Oblast in Ukraine. The settlement is located west of the city of Kamianske and south of the Kamianske Reservoir. It belongs to Verkhnodniprovsk urban hromada, one of the hromadas of Ukraine. Population:

History 

During World War II this village was under German occupation from 1941 to 1943.

It acquired the status of an urban-type settlement in 1966. A poultry farm was here.

In 1985 a new department store was built here.

In January 1989 the population was 4142 people. 

In January 2013 the population was 4187 people.

Until 18 July 2020, Novomykolaivka belonged to Verkhnodniprovsk Raion. The raion was abolished in July 2020 as part of the administrative reform of Ukraine, which reduced the number of raions of Dnipropetrovsk Oblast to seven. The area of Verkhnodniprovsk Raion was merged into Kamianske Raion.

Economy

Transportation
Verkhnodniprovsk railway station is located in Novomykolaivka. It is on the railway connecting Kamianske and Kryvyi Rih.

Novomykolaivka is on Highway H08 which connects Kamianske and Kremenchuk. Another paved road runs to Verkhivtseve.

References

Urban-type settlements in Kamianske Raion